Safari Ltd is an American family-owned manufacturer and global distributor of animal figurine toys. Since 1982, they have produced painted figurines designed to educate children, with the stated goal of teaching the importance of nature and conservation through play.

The company's offerings include more than 1,000 products, including dinosaurs, wildlife, dragons and fairies, horses and farm life, reptiles and sea life.

History
Safari Ltd was founded in 1982 by a German-born husband and wife team, Bernard and Rosemarie Rubel. Their goal was to aid in wildlife conservation by raising awareness of endangered species. Inspired by a deck of educational playing cards featuring photographs of endangered animals, they initially began by photographing native species in Florida and selling postcards of the photos at zoos and other attractions.

The Rubels would later return to Germany and lay eyes on the educational figurines that led them to develop the museum-quality figurines Safari manufactures today.

The company soon expanded to offer toys based on dinosaurs and prehistoric life, utilizing the paleontology community to aid in making the most scientifically accurate figure based on current research. This led to the company's partnership with the Carnegie Museum of Natural History. As a result of the partnership and realistic quality of the figurines, Safari was considered a leader in the animal figurine niche.

Presently, Safari Ltd is run by the Rubels’ grandson Alexandre Pariente, who heads the company with his wife, Christina Pariente. Under Alexandre's tenure the company has invested more in developing online resources, including an in-house wikisource coined SafariPedia that encourages children and educators to use it in tandem with Safari Ltd products.

Brand
Bernie the Gator is Safari Ltd's mascot and pays homage to founder Bernard Amadeus Rubel. The alligator is a popular animal commonly associated with the state of Florida, where Safari Ltd is headquartered.

Design
All figurines are phthalate and lead-free, and adhere to worldwide testing standards.

A group of professional sculptors research each animal's anatomy prior to creating a lifelike model. This model is then sent to the manufacturer for large-scale production, and each figurine is hand painted in order to capture the animal's unique and distinctive features. Each figurine in inscribed with its name on the belly on the animal (in English) to aid in easy identification of the animal.

Retailers
The company is headquartered in Jacksonville, Florida, selling to a principal market within the United States, but serves international markets as well. Safari Ltd sells to distributors and retailers around the globe, providing museum-quality figurines to zoos, museums, aquariums, specialty toy stores, gift stores, arts and crafts stores, grocery stores, educational stores, and more.

Licensing Agreements
Carnegie Museum of Natural History, Pittsburgh, PA. 
Contract with Safari Ltd signed – October 1, 1986- February 13, 2015
Founded in 1896 by Andrew Carnegie, this historic museum holds 22 million specimens exhibiting 10,000 at any given time. It first made history in the year 1899 with the unearthing of Diplodocus Carnegii, and today the Museum maintains the largest collection of Jurassic dinosaurs displayed in the Their Time exhibition. The Carnegie Collection from Safari Ltd and the Carnegie Museum lasted nearly three decades. Additionally, the collection contributed to positioning Safari Ltd as a leader in the dinosaur figurine community.

Monterey Bay Aquarium, Monterey, CA. 
Contract with Safari Ltd signed – December 4, 1990
This public aquarium was founded in 1984 at the site of a former sardine cannery, Cannery Row. Today it is an institution housing 35,000 sea creatures, which represents 550 species on display. Safari Ltd and the Monterey Bay Aquarium signed a contract on December 4, 1990 to create a scaled Sea Life collection designed using the expertise of Monterey Bay Aquarium's marine biologists and Safari Ltd's expert sculptors. Together they've created a collection of figurines which is updated based on current scientific research.

Awards and recognition
Best Toy – Toddler in Reader's Favorites, Baby & Children's Product News (Won: 2017) 

Top Ten Prehistoric Animals of 2016, DinoToyBlog (Won, First Place: 2016) 

Healthiest Employer in South Florida, South Florida Business Journal (Nominated: 2017) 

Best Prehistoric Animal Toy Figure, Prehistoric Times Magazine (Won: 2013, 2014, 2015, 2016, 2017, 2018, 2019, 2020, 2021)

References

Manufacturing companies established in 1982
Miami Gardens, Florida
Figurine manufacturers
Family-owned companies of the United States